Ohio currently has 5 rivers that host populations of either rainbow trout, brown trout, or brook trout. These rivers are the Mad River, the Clear Fork River, Clear Creek, the Chagrin River, and the Rocky River.

The Mad River

Ohio's oldest trout stream is the Mad River. Stocking of this river began in the late 19th century with the introduction of Brook trout. In 1884 Rainbow trout were introduced to the stream. In 1931 the Ohio Department of Natural Resources (ODNR) Division of Wildlife took control of the Rainbow trout project. The department continued to support the project until 1984 when the state introduced Brown trout in their stead. Today the stream is stocked annually with 6"-8" brown trout to supplement the population.

Public access points can be found at various locations along the river which begins in Logan County near the city of Bellefontaine and runs southwest to Dayton where it flows into the Great Miami River. These access points are generally small and tend to be next to bridges where local roads cross the river.

As there are hatches of mayflies, caddis flies, and other popular trout foods throughout the spring, summer, and fall months, fly fishing on the river is viable. Other popular methods of fishing include the use of in-line spinners such as Rooster Tails or Mepps, or the use of live bait rigs or Berkley Power Bait.

The minimum size required to keep trout caught on the Mad River is 12 inches, and the daily catch limit is two fish.

The Clear Fork River

The Clear Fork River is located near the town of Loudonville, OH, about one hour north of the city of Columbus, OH. It is divided into two parts, the Upper and the Lower branches. It was first stocked in the early 1980s by local fishing clubs, and the ODNR began in 1992 to stock it annually with 6"-8" brown trout. Two of its tributaries, Cedar Fork on the Upper branch and Pine Run on the Lower branch, are also stocked. The Upper branch has limited accessibility and runs from the Clear Fork Reservoir East to Pleasant Hill Lake. The Lower Branch runs East from the Pleasant Hill Dam through Mohican State Park where it ends at the Mohican River.

Fishermen who wish to visit this stream should go to the covered bridge at Mohican State Park. There is plenty of parking, a playground for the kids, a primitive campground just downstream, and easy access to the stream. Fly fishing is excellent as there are many open areas to cast and several nice holes with hemlock trees holding their branches over them waiting for the fisherman to drift a dry fly or a nymph under them. The stream has a great annual hatch of mayflies, including sulphers, light cahills, drakes, and many caddisflies, as well. Other popular methods include the use of in-line spinners and live bait.

This is a very scenic river with great accessibility. The downfall is that in the late spring and summer months many other visitors are attracted to the stream such as rafters, tubers, and swimmers, which can negatively affect fishing as the water becomes too disturbed. Other than that, this is a great place to fish for trout in Ohio. The daily catch limit is two fish and a minimum keep size of 12" is in effect.
note=most of the swimmers, tubers, and rafters use the state park camping area for this activity, the best trout fishing for large browns is upstream from the covered bridge.

Clear Creek
Located just southeast of Lancaster in Clear Creek Metro Park lies Clear Creek, one of the newest streams in Ohio to receive the title of trout stream. Overseen by the ODNR, the river is stocked annually with 6"-8" Brown trout. It is the only trout stream in the Southeastern portion of Ohio.

The fishable area runs throughout the entirety of Clear Creek Metro Park and access points can be found along the road that runs through the park.

This trout stream has a minimum keep size of 12" for trout and a daily catch limit of two trout.

The Chagrin River and the Rocky River

A tributary in Geauga County of the Chagrin River, and the Rocky River and its tributaries, located in Medina County, are the host to populations of wild Brook trout in Ohio. The Chagrin tributary is the only remaining naturally occurring population of native Brook Trout in Ohio. Both of these rivers are located in Northeast Ohio. State regulations prohibit possession of trout from these waters. For this reason it is advisable to use barbless hooks when fishing for trout in either of these two rivers but it is legal to harvest steelhead trout from these two rivers.

See also
Fishing in Alabama
Fishing in Wyoming

References

External links
 ODNR wildlife page

Fishing in the United States
Water in Ohio